The men's horizontal bar competition was one of eight events for male competitors in artistic gymnastics at the 1980 Summer Olympics in Moscow. The qualification and final rounds took place on July 20, 22 and 25th at the Luzhniki Palace of Sports. There were 65 competitors from 14 nations, with nations competing in the team event having 6 gymnasts while other nations could have to up to 3 gymnasts. The event was won by Stoyan Deltchev of Bulgaria, the nation's first medal in the horizontal bar. The Soviet Union took silver (Alexander Dityatin) and bronze (Nikolai Andrianov), reaching the podium for the first time since 1968. Japan's three-Games gold medal streak ended, with no Japanese gymnasts competing due to the American-led boycott.

Background

This was the 15th appearance of the event, which is one of the five apparatus events held every time there were apparatus events at the Summer Olympics (no apparatus events were held in 1900, 1908, 1912, or 1920). Two of the six finalists from 1976 returned: bronze medalist Henri Boerio of France and Ferenc Donath of Hungary. Japan had dominated the apparatus for decades, but would not compete in 1980 due to the American-led boycott. The reigning (1979) world champion, American Kurt Thomas, was also out due to the boycott. The Soviet Union, which had failed to medal in the apparatus the last two Games, had a strong team that looked likely to end that drought. Stoyan Deltchev of Bulgaria, fourth at the 1979 world championships, was the strongest contender against the Soviets.

Brazil made its debut in the men's horizontal bar. Hungary made its 13th appearance, tying the United States (absent from the parallel bars event for the first time since the inaugural 1896 Games) for most of any nation.

Competition format

Each nation entered a team of six gymnasts or up to three individual gymnasts. All entrants in the gymnastics competitions performed both a compulsory exercise and a voluntary exercise for each apparatus. The scores for all 12 exercises were summed to give an individual all-around score. These exercise scores were also used for qualification for the apparatus finals. The two exercises (compulsory and voluntary) for each apparatus were summed to give an apparatus score. The top 6 in each apparatus participated in the finals, except that nations were limited to two finalists each; others were ranked 7th through 65th. Half of the preliminary score carried over to the final.

Schedule

All times are Moscow Time (UTC+3)

Results

Sixty-five gymnasts competed in the compulsory and optional rounds on July 20 and 22. The six highest scoring gymnasts advanced to the final on July 25. Each country was limited to two competitors in the final. Half of the points earned by each gymnast during both the compulsory and optional rounds carried over to the final. This constitutes the "prelim" score.

References

Official Olympic Report
www.gymnasticsresults.com
www.gymn-forum.net

Men's horizontal bar
Men's 1980
Men's events at the 1980 Summer Olympics